Foynes is a town and major port in County Limerick in the midwest of Ireland, located at the edge of hilly land on the southern bank of the Shannon Estuary. The population of the town was 520 as of the 2016 census.

Foynes's role as seaport
Foynes as a port has a long history, being first surveyed in 1837, and is now the location of a major deep water seaport operated by the Shannon Foynes Port Company, an amalgamation under the Harbours Act 2000 of the agencies operating the ports of Limerick and Foynes. It is anticipated that more traffic from the upstream Limerick Port will ultimately be diverted there as the latter portlands are redeveloped as commercial and residential properties. A railway line to Limerick via Patrickswell and Raheen is in existence but not operational. Iarnród Éireann's policy of concentrating on what it sees as more profitable passenger operations means the Port's traffic is entirely served by road.

Foynes Port Company was amalgamated with the Shannon Estuary Ports Company (which had responsibility for the other areas of the Estuary) in 2000, to form Shannon Foynes Port Company (SFPC). SFPC is the second largest port facility in Ireland, handling over 10 million tonnes of cargo annually through the six terminals currently operational. Planning permission has been granted for an LNG import terminal at Ballylongford, County Kerry, within SFPC's jurisdiction; once constructed it will add considerably to throughput.

Foynes's role in aviation

During the late 1930s and early 1940s, land-based planes lacked sufficient flying range for Atlantic crossings. Foynes was the last port of call on its eastern shore for seaplanes.  As a result, Foynes would become one of the biggest civilian airports in Europe during World War II.  Surveying flights for flying boat operations were made by Charles Lindbergh in 1933 and a terminal was begun in 1935.  The first transatlantic proving flights were operated on 5 July 1937 with a Pan Am Sikorsky S-42 service from Botwood, Newfoundland on the Bay of Exploits and a BOAC Short Empire service from Foynes with successful transits of twelve and fifteen-and-a-quarter hours respectively. Services to New York, Southampton, Montreal, Poole and Lisbon followed, the first non-stop New York service operating on 22 June 1942 in 25 hours 40 minutes.

Foynes Flying Boat Museum

All of this began to change following the construction and opening in 1942 of Shannon Airport on flat bogland on the northern bank of the Estuary. Foynes flying-boat station closed in 1946. A college for the learning of the Irish language was opened in the former terminal in 1954. The Port Trustees purchased the building in 1980 and the Foynes Flying Boat Museum leased a portion in 1988.

One of Foynes's main claims to fame is the invention there of Irish Coffee. This came about, it is said, in order to alleviate the suffering of cold and wet passengers during its aviation days in the 1930s and early 1940s. Brendan O'Regan was Catering Comptroller between 1943-1945 and after had the same position at Shannon Airport where he established the world's first duty-free shop amongst his innovations. The Foynes Flying Boat Museum contains much memorabilia from that era, including the original radio and weather room, along with its equipment and a full-size replica Boeing 314 flying boat.

Transport

Rail

Foynes railway station opened on 29 April 1858, as the terminus of a line from Limerick which was subsequently extended west from Ballingrane to Tralee. The station closed to passengers on 4 February 1963, but remained open for freight traffic until 30 October 2000. The Limerick–Foynes railway line was "mothballed" at the end of 2001 (the line from Ballingrane to Tralee having been lifted in the late 1980s). The annual Irish Rail weed-spraying train last traversed the line on 7 May 2002.

The Shannon Foynes Port Company reportedly maintained contact with Irish Rail to discuss reopening the line for bulk cargo projects and, in April 2011, the company's chairperson said that they were confident that the rail link could be reopened. In June 2015, €800,000 of EU funding was secured for a study to develop the business case to reopen the line. In early 2023, it was announced that a contractor had been appointed and works on reopening the line were due to commence in February 2023.

Bus
Bus Éireann route number 314 provides a few journeys a day to Limerick via Askeaton. In the opposite direction, there are buses to Glin with a weekend service to Tralee and a summer service to Ballybunion.

Places of interest

Foynes is near to Adare, a national heritage town, and the city of Limerick. The main gateway to the region is Shannon Airport. Foynes is located on the N69 "coast road" to Tarbert and Tralee in County Kerry.

Sports
Saint Senan's GAA club draws its players from the parish centred on Foynes and the neighbouring town of Shanagolden. Although it has fielded hurling teams on occasions, it is primarily a Gaelic football club. After winning the intermediate championship in 2003, Saint Senan's were narrowly beaten in the final of the 2006 Limerick Senior Football Championship. Its predecessor, the Foynes team, won its only senior championship in 1907.

See also
 List of towns and villages in Ireland.

References

External links
 Destination Foynes - the Flying Boat Era 1937-1945
 Shannon Foynes Port Company

Port cities and towns in the Republic of Ireland
Towns and villages in County Limerick